Soberana Plus, technical name FINLAY-FR-1A, is a COVID-19 candidate vaccine produced by the Finlay Institute, a Cuban epidemiological research institute.

Medical uses 
It can be used as a third (booster) dose for Soberana 02 vaccine at eight weeks. It's also studied as an independent single-dose vaccine.

Efficacy 
It combined the Soberana 02, the vaccine booster shot shows an efficacy of 91.2%. The final result of a third dose of Soberana Plus increased the efficacy up to 92.4%. Efficacy against severe disease and death is 100% for the heterologous three-dose regimen.

Clinical trials

Booster dose 

Soberana Plus has also been studied as a booster dose for Soberana 02.

Single dose

Authorizations 
On 20 August 2021, Cuba approved Soberana Plus as a booster after two doses of Soberana 02. On 23 September, Cuba approved Soberana Plus for COVID-19 survivors over 19 years old. On 7 December, the authorization was expanded to include COVID-19 survivors from 2 to 18 years old.

See also 
 Soberana 02

References 

Clinical trials
Cuban COVID-19 vaccines
Science and technology in Cuba
Conjugate vaccines